Carbonodraco is an extinct genus of acleistorhinid parareptile known from the Late Carboniferous of Ohio. It contains a single species, Carbonodraco lundi. It was closely related to Colobomycter, a parareptile from the early Permian of Oklahoma. Carbonodraco is the oldest known parareptile, and is slightly older than Erpetonyx, the previously oldest known parareptile. Specimens of Carbonodraco are limited to skull and jaw fragments found at the Ohio Diamond Coal mine in Linton, Ohio. These include the holotype specimen (CM 23055, a crushed skull) and two referred specimens (NHMUK R. 2667, a right jaw; CM 81536, a pair of dentaries). Several of the Carbonodraco specimens were previously referred to the Carboniferous eureptile Cephalerpeton by Reisz & Baird (1983). They were recognized as a distinct species in a 2019 study by Mann et al.

References 

Carboniferous reptiles of North America
Procolophonomorphs
Fossil taxa described in 2019
Prehistoric reptile genera